Luxembourg competed at the 2022 World Athletics Championships in Eugene, Oregon from 15 to 24 July 2022. Luxembourg had entered 2 athletes.

Results

Men
Track and road events

Women
Track and road events

References

Luxembourg
World Championships in Athletics
2022